Edward Henderson may refer to:

 Edward Elers Delaval Henderson (1878–1917),  British recipient of the Victoria Cross
 Edward Henderson (Archdeacon of Pontefract) (1916–1997), Archdeacon of Pontefract, 1968–1981
 Edward Henderson (bishop) (1910–1986), Bishop of Bath and Wells, 1960–1975, son of the priest (1873-1947)
 Edward Firth Henderson (1917–1995), British diplomat
 Edward Henderson (priest) (1873–1947), priest in the Church of England
 Ed Henderson (1884–1964), American baseball pitcher
 Eddie Henderson (soccer) (born 1967), American soccer player 
 Eddie Henderson (musician) (born 1940), American jazz musician